Albarka Air was an airline based in Abuja, Nigeria. It operated scheduled and charter services within Nigeria and charters to other countries in central and west Africa. Its main base was Nnamdi Azikiwe International Airport, Abuja.

Code data

IATA Code: F4
ICAO Code: NBK
Callsign: AL-AIR

Destinations

Albarka Air operated services to the following domestic scheduled destinations (at January 2005): Abuja, Lagos, Maiduguri and Yola.

References

Defunct airlines of Nigeria
Airlines established in 1999
Airlines disestablished in 2007
1999 establishments in Nigeria
2007 disestablishments in Nigeria
Economy of Abuja